Bevan Bennett (born 9 September 1981) is a South African cricketer. He played in 92 first-class, 56 List A, and 8 Twenty20 matches from 2005 to 2016. His twin brother, Kevin, also played first-class cricket.

References

External links
 

1981 births
Living people
South African cricketers
Border cricketers
Warriors cricketers
Cricketers from East London, Eastern Cape